This is a list of fighter aces in World War II from United States. For other countries see List of World War II flying aces by country

A

B

C

D

E

F

G

H

I

J

K

L

M

N

O

P

Q

R

S

T

U

V

W

Y

Z

Notes

Abbreviations 

 "DOW" in Notes means Died of Wounds which, in some cases, may have occurred months later.
"KIA" in Notes means Killed in action (dates are included where possible).
 "KIFA" in Notes means Killed in Flying Accident.
 "MIA" in Notes means Missing in action.
"POW" in Notes means Prisoner of War.
"USAAF" means United States Army Air Forces
"USMC" means United States Marine Corps
"USN" means United States Navy

Awards

References

Further reading 

United States
United States Army Air Forces lists
Ame
Aces